Rositsa Stamenova (born 6 March 1955) is a retired sprinter from Bulgaria. She won two medals at the European Indoor Championships. Her personal best time was 50.82 seconds, achieved in August 1984 in Prague. She also competed in the women's 400 metres at the 1980 Summer Olympics.

Achievements

References

External links

1955 births
Living people
Bulgarian female sprinters
Athletes (track and field) at the 1980 Summer Olympics
Olympic athletes of Bulgaria
Olympic female sprinters
Friendship Games medalists in athletics
20th-century Bulgarian women
21st-century Bulgarian women